Kockelman is a surname. Notable people with the surname include:

 Kara Kockelman (born 1969), American civil and transportation engineer
 Paul Kockelman, America anthropologist

See also
 Kockelmans